Bayyaram is a mandal in Mahabubabad district of Telangana.

Bayyaram Mines

In 2010, there was a controversy regarding lease of 56,690 hectares of land in Bayyaram, Garla and Nelakondapally mandals. This has finally resulted in cancellation of the lease by Ministry of Mines.

Villages
The villages in Bayyaram mandal include:
 Balajipeta 	
 Bayyaram 	
 Gowraram 	
 Irsulapuram 	
 Kambalapalli 	
 Kothapeta 	
 Kotagadda
 Ramachandrapuram
 Rangapuram
 Satyanarayanapuram
 Uppalapadu 	
 Venkatapuram 	
 Venkatrampuram
 Yellandu

References

Mandals in Khammam district